The 2016 United States presidential election in Delaware was held on Tuesday, November 8, 2016, as part of the 2016 United States presidential election in which all 50 states plus the District of Columbia participated. Delaware voters chose electors to represent them in the Electoral College via a popular vote, pitting the Republican Party's nominee, businessman Donald Trump, and running mate Indiana Governor Mike Pence against Democratic Party nominee, former Secretary of State Hillary Clinton, and her running mate Virginia Senator Tim Kaine. Delaware has three electoral votes in the Electoral College.

Clinton carried the state with 53.4% of the vote to Trump's 41.9%, a victory margin of 11.37%. Although Democrats continued their streak of winning Delaware, a state that has not gone to the Republicans in a presidential election since 1988, it swung 7.19% to the right relative to 2012, and Trump managed to flip Kent County, which had not gone red since 2004. This was the first time since 1968 that Delaware did not vote for the same candidate as neighboring Pennsylvania.

Primary elections

Democratic primary

Five candidates appeared on the Democratic presidential primary ballot: 
Bernie Sanders
Hillary Clinton
Rocky De La Fuente
Martin O'Malley (withdrawn)
Danny Choi (withdrawn)

Opinion polling

Results

Republican primary
Six candidates appeared on the Republican presidential primary ballot: 
Jeb Bush (withdrawn)
Ben Carson (withdrawn)
Ted Cruz
John Kasich
Marco Rubio (suspended, to convention)
Donald Trump

Opinion polling

Results

Green convention

On April 2, 2016, the Green Party of Delaware announced that all 4 of its delegates would support Jill Stein at the national convention.

General election

Predictions

Polling

Statewide results

Results by county

Counties that flipped from Democratic to Republican
Kent (largest city: Dover)

By congressional district
Due to the state's low population, only one congressional district is allocated. This district is called the At-Large district, because it covers the entire state, and thus is equivalent to the statewide election results.

Turnout
According to Delaware's Elections website, voter turnout was 65.57% with 445,228 ballots cast out of 679,027 registered voters.

See also
 United States presidential elections in Delaware
 2016 Democratic Party presidential debates and forums
 2016 Democratic Party presidential primaries
 2016 Republican Party presidential debates and forums
 2016 Republican Party presidential primaries

References

External links
 RNC 2016 Republican Nominating Process 
 Green papers for 2016 primaries, caucuses, and conventions

DE
2016
Presidential